Burak Deniz (born 17 February 1991) is a Turkish actor and model who predominantly works in Turkish series and films. He is best known for his leading portrayal of Murat Sarsılmaz in television series Aşk Laftan Anlamaz (2016–17) which was highly acclaimed, and later as Barış Aktan in TV series Bizim Hikaye. In 2020, he played the role of Mehmet Kadir Bilmez in the streaming series Yarım Kalan Aşklar.

In 2021, he went on to appear as Celal Kün in TV series Maraşlı, followed by playing Asaf in Disney+ series The Ignorant Angels (2022) and Maran in the Netflix series Shahmaran (2023). Deniz is also known for his role as Ozan in the film Arada (2018) and Semih in Netflix original Don't Leave (2022).

Early life 
Burak Deniz was born on 17 February 1991, in Istanbul, and grew up in İzmit. He graduated from İzmit 50 Yıl Cumhuriyet Primary School, and then from Gazi High School. He studied History of Art at the Çanakkale 18 Mart University. In the acting workshop he went to while he was still in high school, he was discovered by the casting director Gökçe Doruk Erten who helped him start his career.

Career
Deniz began his television career with the TV series Kolej Günlüğü (College Diary), where he had the role of Onur. In 2012, he starred as Tarık in the TV series Sultan. In 2013, he starred as Burak Topçuoğlu in the TV series Kaçak.

In 2015, Deniz appeared as Aras in the TV series Medcezir. It is an adaptation of the American TV series The O.C., created by Josh Schwartz. Later in 2015, Deniz starred as Toprak in TV series Tatlı Küçük Yalancılar which is inspired by American TV show Pretty Little Liars. It stars Deniz, Şükrü Özyıldız, Bensu Soral, Büşra Develi, Melisa Şenolsun, Dilan Çiçek Deniz and Beste Kökdemir. In 2016, he starred as Mert in the TV series Gecenin Kraliçesi (Night Queen) alongside Meryem Uzerli and Murat Yıldırım.

Later in 2016, he was cast as Murat Sarsılmaz opposite Hande Erçel in the TV series Aşk Laftan Anlamaz (Love Doesn't Understand Words). The story is set in Istanbul and follows a workplace romance at a multinational fashion company, Sarte. It is a romantic comedy series that revolves around Deniz's character, Murat Sarsılmaz, who is the crown prince of the textile empire.

In 2017, he starred as Barış Aktan alongside Hazal Kaya in the TV series Bizim Hikaye (Our Story). It is an adaptation of the UK original series, Shameless. In 2018, he made his cinematic debut with Arada, which is about a punk singer who wants to leave Turkey, and ends up a nightmarish, hallucinatory trip through Istanbul.

In 2020, Burak Deniz starred as Kadir Bilmez in the web series Yarım Kalan Aşklar (Unfinished Loves) opposite Dilan Çiçek Deniz. It is the story of a young boy named Ozan, who works as a journalist but loses his life at a traffic accident, only to get resurrected in a new body again.

After Yarım Kalan Aşklar, Deniz starred as Celal "Maraşlı" Kün in the TV series Maraşlı alongside Alina Boz.

Filmography

Music videos

References

External links
 

Burak Deniz
Living people
1991 births
Male actors from Istanbul
Turkish male television actors
Turkish male models
21st-century Turkish male actors
Turkish male film actors